Costa's hummingbird (Calypte costae) is a bird species in the hummingbird family Trochilidae. It breeds in the arid region of the southwest United States and northwest Mexico; it winters in western Mexico.

Taxonomy
Costa's hummingbird was formally described by the French ornithologist Jules Bourcier in 1839 and given the binomial name Ornismya costae. Bourcier chose the specific epithet to honour the French nobleman Louis Marie Pantaleon Costa, Marquis de Beauregard (1806–1864). The type locality is Magdalena Bay on the western coast of the Mexican state of Baja California Sur. Costa's hummingbird is now placed in the genus Calypte that was introduced in 1856 by John Gould. The species is monotypic: no subspecies are recognised.

Hybrids between this species and Anna's hummingbird, the black-chinned hummingbird as well as the broad-tailed hummingbird are known.

Description
This species is very small, a mature adult growing to only  in length, a wingspan of 11 cm, and an average weight of 3.05 g for males and 3.22 g for females. The male has a mainly green back and flanks, a small black tail and wings, and patches of white below their gorgeted throat and tail. Its most distinguishing feature is its vibrant purple cap and throat with the throat feathers flaring out and back behind its head. The female is not as distinct as the male, having grayish-green above with a white underbelly.

Distribution and habitat
Costa's hummingbird is fairly common in the arid brushy deserts and any nearby gardens of the Southwestern United States and the Baja California Peninsula of Mexico.

Behaviour

Breeding

The male Costa's hummingbird's courtship display is a spirited series of swoops and arcing dives, carefully utilizing a proper angle to the sun to show off his violet plumage to impress prospective mates. Each high-speed dive will also pass within inches of the female, perched on a nearby branch, which will be accented by a high-pitched shriek that is produced by the tail. Separately, the male will perch and produce similar sounds in his song—except, the song is vocal rather than tail-generated.

The female constructs a small cup-shaped nest out of plant fibers, down, and at times spider silk, coated with lichen to hold it together. The nest is situated on a yucca stalk or tree limb. The female lays just two eggs, which are white in color, which she will incubate for 15 to 18 days before the young hatch. The young leave the nest after 20 to 23 days.

Diet

Like all other hummingbird species, Costa's hummingbird feeds on flower nectar and any tiny insects that it happens to find in the flower petals.

Torpor
As with other hummingbird species, it can slow down its metabolism during cold nights when it enters a hibernation-like state known as torpor and its heart and respiration rate are dramatically slowed.

Conservation
The IUCN describes them as of least concern. The population is stable and there are no known threats. They are found in at least one protected area.

References

External links 

 
 

Costa's hummingbird
Birds of Mexico
Costa's hummingbird
Endemic birds of Southwestern North America
Fauna of the Baja California Peninsula
Fauna of the Colorado Desert
Fauna of the Lower Colorado River Valley
Fauna of the Mojave Desert
Fauna of the Sonoran Desert
Native birds of the Southwestern United States
Taxa named by Jules Bourcier